On the Sphere and Cylinder is a work that was published by Archimedes in two volumes c. 225 BCE. It most notably details how to find the surface area of a sphere and the volume of the contained ball and the analogous values for a cylinder, and was the first to do so.

Contents

The principal formulae derived in On the Sphere and Cylinder are those mentioned above: the surface area of the sphere, the volume of the contained ball, and surface area and volume of the cylinder.  Let  be the radius of the sphere and cylinder, and  be the height of the cylinder, with the assumption
that the cylinder is a right cylinder—the side is perpendicular to both caps. In his work, Archimedes showed that the surface area of a cylinder is equal to:

and that the volume of the same is:

On the sphere, he showed that the surface area is four times the area of its great circle. In modern terms, this means that the surface area is equal to:

The result for the volume of the contained ball stated that it is two-thirds the volume of a circumscribed cylinder, meaning that the volume is

When the inscribing cylinder is tight and has a height , so that the sphere touches the cylinder at the top and bottom, he
showed that both the volume and the surface area of the sphere were two-thirds that of the cylinder.  This implies the area of the sphere
is equal to the area of the cylinder minus its caps.  This result would eventually lead to the Lambert cylindrical equal-area projection, 
a way of mapping the world that accurately represents areas.  Archimedes was particularly proud of this latter result (as it was allegedly inscribed on his tombstone discovered by Cicero), and so he asked for a sketch of a sphere inscribed in a cylinder to be inscribed on his grave.  Later, Roman philosopher Marcus Tullius Cicero discovered the tomb, which had been overgrown by surrounding vegetation.

The argument Archimedes used to prove the formula for the volume of a ball was rather involved in its geometry, and many modern textbooks have a simplified version using the concept of a limit, which did not exist in Archimedes' time. Archimedes used an inscribed half-polygon in a semicircle, then rotated both to create a conglomerate of frustums in a sphere, of which he then determined the volume.

It seems that this is not the original method Archimedes used to derive this result, but the best formal argument available to him in the Greek mathematical tradition.  His original method likely involved a clever use of levers.  A palimpsest stolen from the Greek Orthodox Church in the early 20th century, which reappeared at auction in 1998, contained many of Archimedes works, including The Method of Mechanical Theorems, in which he describes a method to determine volumes which involves balances, centers of mass and infinitesimal slices.

See also
 Archimedean property
 Cylinder

Notes

References

S. H. Gould, The Method of Archimedes, The American Mathematical Monthly.  Vol. 62, No. 7 (Aug. - Sep., 1955), pp. 473–476

 Lucio Lombardo Radice, La matematica da Pitagora a Newton, Roma, Editori Riuniti, 1971.
 Attilio Frajese, Opere di Archimede, Torino, U.T.E.T., 1974.

Ancient Greek mathematical works
Euclidean geometry
Works by Archimedes
225 BC